Gorenje Dole is a Slovene place name that may refer to:

Gorenje Dole, Krško, a village in the Municipality of Krško, southeastern Slovenia
Gorenje Dole, Škocjan, a village in the Municipality of Škocjan, southeastern Slovenia